Marco Kutscher (born 2 May 1975 in Norden, Lower Saxony) is a German equestrian who competes in the sport of show jumping.

Kutcher originally finished fourth in the show jumping competition at the 2004 Summer Olympics in Athens, Greece, but was moved to third place and received a bronze medal after Irish gold medal winner Cian O'Connor was stripped of his medal after a doping scandal involving O'Connor's horse Waterford Crystal.

Career 
He was selected for the 2004 Summer Olympics where he rode Montender and won the bronze medal in individual jumping following the disqualification of Irish rider Cian O'Connor.

In 2008 he compete with Cornet Obolensky at his second Olympics.

Champion of 2015 Los Angeles Longines Master with Van Gogh.

Horses

Current
 Cash (born 1996), Holsteiner horse, brown, Gelding, sire: Carthago, damsire: Lavall II, Owner: Madeleine Winter-Schulze
 Cornet Obolensky (born 1999), Grey, Stallion, sire: Clinton, damsire: Heartbreaker

Former show horses
 Allerdings (born 2000), Chestnut, Gelding, sire: Arpeggio, damsire: Diamantino
 Montender (born 1994), dark brown, Stallion, sire: Contender, damsire: Burggraaf
 Controe (born 1992), Holsteiner horse, brown, Stallion, sire: Contender, damsire: Aloube Z

References

1975 births
Living people
People from Norden, Lower Saxony
Sportspeople from Lower Saxony
Equestrians at the 2004 Summer Olympics
Equestrians at the 2008 Summer Olympics
German male equestrians
Olympic bronze medalists for Germany
Olympic equestrians of Germany
German show jumping riders
Olympic medalists in equestrian
Medalists at the 2004 Summer Olympics